Day Night Day Night is a 2006 drama film written and directed by Julia Loktev. It documents 48 hours in the life of an anonymous 19-year-old as she prepares to become a suicide bomber in Times Square. It premiered on May 25, 2006 in the Directors' Fortnight section of the 58th Annual Cannes Film Festival.

Cast

Release

Critical reception 
On review aggregation website Rotten Tomatoes, the film holds an approval rating of 69% based on 45 reviews, and an average rating of 6.6/10. On Metacritic, the film has a weighted average score of 61 out of 100, based on 14 critics, indicating "generally favorable reviews".

Variety's Justing Chang wrote "a dramatically limited but strangely powerful portrait of a young would-be terrorist who sets out to blow herself up in Times Square," adding, "By turns frustrating and impressive in its austerity, Julia Loktev’s experimental first feature is too radically minimalist to find much of an audience beyond the festival circuit, although those willing to stick with it may find it an authentically harrowing if not especially revealing experience."

Slant'''s Ed Gonzalez described the film as "nothing more, nothing less than another exercise in sadistic immediacy."

Williams received positive reviews for her film debut. Stephen Holden of The New York Times wrote "To study the unsettled emotional weather on the face of Luisa Williams, the intense, dark-eyed star of 'Day Night Day Night,' is to be reminded of Norma Desmond’s famous boast, 'We had faces then.'"

"Determination, rage, uncertainty, bravado, modesty and panic are among the feelings that flicker over her slightly feral features," Holden wrote. "Whatever her ancestry (Ms. Williams is a native New Yorker making her screen debut), she has a face you’ll never forget."

Ty Burr described Williams as "remarkable" in a short piece for Movie Nation.

"Williams emits a sort of radiance...she has an unforgettable face, the way women in certain European art movies do," Wesley Morris wrote for The Boston Globe. "There's nothing conventional about it: Her dark, tired-seeming eyes recede into their sockets, her mouth and nose are almost beak-like, drawn into a sort of permanent frown...in the film's agonizing last 20 minutes, her severe and opaque countenance opens into a universe of transparent emotional distress."

 Accolades Day Night Day Night'' won the Regard Jeune award for young filmmakers at the 2006 Cannes Film Festival., the Maverick Award for Best Narrative Feature at the 2006 Woodstock Film Festival., and Feature Film Award at the Montréal Festival of New Cinema 2006.

References

External links 
 
 
 
 

2006 films
2006 drama films
French drama films
German drama films
English-language French films
English-language German films
Films about terrorism
American drama films
2000s English-language films
2000s American films
2000s French films
2000s German films